Agnes Giberne (19 November 1845 – 20 August 1939) was a prolific British novelist and scientific writer. Her fiction was typical of Victorian evangelical fiction with moral or religious themes for children. She also wrote books on science for young people, a handful of historical novels, and one well-regarded biography.

Biography
Giberne was born in Belgaum, Karnataka, India, the daughter of Captain Charles Giberne (16 June 180821 December 1902) of the Bengal Native Infantry and Lydia Mary Wilson (20 May 1890). Her ancestors were Huguenots from Languedoc in France where the "de Gibernes" lived in Chateau de Gibertain. Charles Giberne was from a large family. He had eight sisters and four brothers. Three of his brothers also served in India.

Giberne's parents married at St. Mary the Virgin, Walthamstow on 11 December 1838. It is not absolutely clear how many siblings Giberne had. The British Library's India Family History and Families in British India Society records show:
 Mary Lydia Giberne, on 1 December 1840 at Karrack, Persian Gulf. She died at Ahymednuggar on 7 May 1842, aged 17 months.
 Twins born on 21 January 1844 at Ahmednuggur, with the boy still-born and the girl, Helen Mary Giberne, surviving. However, She died in the first quarter of 1861, aged 17.
 Agnes, born on 19 Nov 1845 at Belgaum, the subject of this page. 
 Florence, born on 1 June 1847 at Poona. However, she died in Brighton on 5 September 1858, aged 11 years.
 Eliza, born on 5 December 1848, At her maternal grandfather's at Worton House, Over-Warton, Oxfordshire. Died aged 79 on 22 February 1928.

By the time of the 1851 census, Lydia Mary was staying with her four surviving daughters at Beach in Weston-super-mare with the Rector of Eyam in Derbyshire and his family. Charles Giberne had already been pensioned off and was staying at no 17, Beaufort, in Bath with two servants. By the time of the 1861 census, only two girls survived, Giberne and her sister Eliza.

Eliza was educated privately,  by governesses and special masters. She began to scribble stories at age seven and shared these with her sisters She ascribed her literary tastes to her mother and her scientific curiosity to her father.

Writing
Giberne states that she began to publish children's stories at seventeen. These were probably short stories in magazines. The first children's book by Giberne in the British Library is A Visit to Aunt Agnes (Religious Tract Society, London, 1864). It was advertised on 24 November 1864 at the price of two shillings. Giberne would have been 19 by then. Copson states that her children's stories were "typical works of Victorian evangelical fiction emphasizing childish faults and the need for salvation."

The lithographs by Kronheim & Co. for A Visit to Aunt Agnes, by courtesy of the University of Florida Digital Collections.

Initially, Giberne's work was signed either A. G. or she was indirectly indicated through identifying other works she had written. The first book in England which bears her name was The Curate's House which she wrote to draw attention to clerical poverty. Giberne had a wider range than just evangelical and didactic stories for young children. She also wrote books targeted at young adolescent girls, which was mainly published by the Religious Tract Society.

Giberne also wrote historical novels including:
Detained in France : a tale of the first French empire (Seeley, 1871). A story about the English people detailed by Napoleon on the outbreak of war.
Aimée: a tale of the days of James the Second (Seeley, 1872). A story about the Huguenot persecution in France and their flight to England.
Coulyng Castle, or, A knight of the olden days  (Seeley, 1875). A picture of castle life under Henry IV and Henry V. 
Roy. A tale in the days of Sir John Moore. (Pearson, 1901). Returns to the theme of those detained by Napoleon, but adds in Sir John Moore's famous retreat and the Battle of Corunna.
Under Puritan rule: a tale of troublous days (National Society's Depository, 1909). Focuses on the sufferings of those Anglican clergy who were deprived of their livings by the Puritans.
 
In 1895 Giberne published A lady of England: the life and letters of Charlotte Maria Tucker (Hodder & Stoughton), who wrote children's fiction under the pseudonym "A Lady of England" (A.L.O.E.), and late in life, became a missionary in India. Giverne's Aunt Caroline Cuffley Giberne (1803-1885) had also worked as a missionary in India, and also concentrated on work with women and girls.

However, Giberne is best remembered for her books popularising science. Giberne was an amateur astronomer who worked on the committee setting up the British Astronomical Association and became a founder-member in 1890. Giberne's first foray into science was a book on astronomy Sun, Moon and Stars: Astronomy for Beginners (Seeley, 1879). She had sent the proofs to Charles Pritchard (29 February 1808 – 28 May 1893), the Savilian Professor of Astronomy at Oxford University and he was so impressed by it that he wrote, without being asked, a very positive introduction.. The Graphic stated that "As an introduction to a science, it could scarcely be more attractive, and it is the best book of the kind we have seen."

The book remained in print for many years and had sold 10,000 copies by 1884, 24,000 copies by 1898, and 26,000 by 1903, when she issued another revised edition. However, this total probably does not include the sales in the United States, where the book was published as The Story of The Sun, Moon, and Stars, as the totals cited come from the edition count on the title page of the Seeley editions, and Seeley would only have counted their own editions, and not those of another publisher.
 
Giberne wrote several other books on Astronomy including:
Among the Stars, or wonderful things in the sky (Seeley, 1884), intended for younger children, where a boy called Ikon has the solar system and stars explained to him by a professor. St James's Gazette said that Giberne "tells about the wonderful things in the sky in clear pleasant language that every child can understand, and in a manner that is probably new to them. Some of the lessons are illustrated by little experiments which will be both amusing and instructive to repeat in the nursery; and there are visits the sun and moon that read like strange and beautiful fairy-tales. In every way this is a most excellent book for children. 
The starry skies, first lessons on the sun, moon and stars (Seeley & Co). In this book Giberne "offered lucid and simple explanations of gravity, the seasons, the rotation of the earth, the moon, the sun, the planets of the solar system, comets, meteors, stars, and nebulae". As with some of the other books for children Giberne used the power of the imagination to help teach scientific fact.
Radiant suns (Seeley & Co, 1895), a sequel to Sun, moon and star but more advanced. It covered the history of astronomy, the relatively new science of spectral analysis, and a discussion of the stellar universe. 
This Wonderful Universe (SPCK, 1895). Completely rewritten and revised for an illustrated edition in 1920. An introduction to the heavens for younger readers.

Giberne did not ignore the other sciences, she also wrote books on:
Geology, with The world's foundations, or Geology for beginners (Seeley, 1882). In her preface, Gilberne noted that some counted Geology to be a dangerous subject, and that there can be no conflict between the Bible, as the word of God, and His handiwork, in the shape of the Geology of the Earth.
Physics, with Twilight Talks, or easy lessons on things around us (Religious Tract Society, 1882).A little volume for children on scientific subjects. In her preface, Giberne says that if the book were called "An introduction to Physics" it would frighten off its intended users.
Hydrology with Father Aldur. A water story, etc. Here again imagination (a sleeping boy dreams of the river as a living being) and scientific fact are interwoven.
Meteorology, with The Ocean of Air, Meteorology for Beginners (Seely, 1890). This volume also had an enthusiastic preface written by Charles Pritchard, again volunteered by him, when he read the proofs. The book described the "gases, water, forms of life, movement, disturbances, and forces within air."  The photographs illustrating the book were said to be "genuine works of art".
Natural History, with A modern Puck, a fairly story for children (Jarrold, 1898). This was ostensibly a fairy story but contained lots of nuggets of information about animal behaviour, insects etc. One review said that the book was one which "teaches much", but unobtrusively and not "as if it were teaching at all," and every healthy-minded child must be delighted "with such a book, with its pleasant and quite natural make-believe." The magic cloak which the fairy used enabled the heroine to see "into the homes of many an animal and insect."
Oceanography, with The Mighty Deep and what we know of it (Pearson, 1902). One reviewer said "Call it oceanography and it is apt to repel; put it in Miss Giberne'e graceful words and it attracts while it teaches.". Another said "It is a singularly informing book, and is written in such a way that any boy or girl of average intelligence will not only understand it readily but will thoroughly enjoy it. There are too too few books of this class."
Science in general, with This Wonder World (Religious Tract Society, 1913). In this volume, Giberne addresses a range of topics "how the wood and the iron and the coal come to be here, and how the air and the water and the fire serve us. Concerning these and other subjects such as flying machines, Miss Giberne writes very simply and effectively."
Botany, with The garden of earth, a little book on plant-life, plantgrowth, and the ways and uses of plants (SPCK, 1920). "It is not a Manual of Botany with hard and dry names, which often make the subject distasteful, but a book introducing us gradually and simply to an intimate and loving acquaintance with the inhabitants of the vegetable world."

Giberne was prolific. At her peak in the 1880s and 1890s, she produced 36 and 33 volumes respectively. Her output tapered off after 1900. However, her output over eight decades indicates her dedication to her work.

Later life

Although the Oxford Dictionary of National Biography states that Giberne wrote for her own interests rather than to earn money, she relied to some extent on her royalty income. Giberne found herself with severe financial problems in 1905, and applied to the Royal Literary Fund. She was now sixty, and was said to have given up the best years of her life to support her ailing father (who had died in 1902). She had failing eyesight, with cataracts in both eyes, and a weak heart. Her income was listed as an annuity, the royalties from her books, and £100 a year from the Indian Civil Service as a pensioner's child. She was awarded £200 from the Royal Literary Fund and £273 from the Royal Bounty Fund, both to be put towards the purchase of a Post Office annuity. However, her royalty income was falling, and her nominal income of £170 was not sufficient due to the rising cost of living, and she had been force to sell some furniture and all of her silver as well as moving into smaller accommodation. This time she was awarded a grant of £50.

The 1911 census found her lodging in rooms at 2, The Avenue, Eastbourne. In 1939 she was living at 21 Enys Road Eastbourne. She died in a nursing home at 16 Motcombe Road, Eastbourne, on 20 August 1939, aged 94. Her estate was worth £539 18s 11d.

List of works
The following list of works has developed largely from a search on the Jisc Library Hub Discover database.. Where necessary, missing details such as page counts and publisher's names have been filled in by searches on WorldCat and on newspaper archives.

See also
Timeline of women in science

Notes

References

External links 

 
 
 
 
 Books by Giberne listed in the catalogue of the British Library.
 Books by Giberne in the Internet Archive
 Books by Giberne in the University of Florida Digital Collections.

1845 births
1939 deaths
19th-century British women writers
19th-century British writers
Amateur astronomers
19th-century British astronomers
English-language writers from India
British women children's writers
People from Belagavi district
Women astronomers
Women writers from Karnataka
Writers from Karnataka
Indian people of French descent